The Göteborg Ladies Open is a women's professional golf tournament on the Swedish Golf Tour and the LET Access Series held in Gothenburg, Sweden.

The tournament was played intermittently between 1985 and 2014, always at Delsjö Golf Club except in 1989 when it was held at Isaberg Golf Club. In 1985, 1988 and 1989 it was included on the Ladies European Tour schedule. 

The 2013 edition was hosted by Karin Sjödin and Linda Wessberg, two former LPGA Tour players that grew up playing at Delsjö Golf Club.

In 2022 the tournament returned, with venue changed to Kungsbacka Golf Club. The club hosted the men's Göteborg Open on the 2021 Nordic Golf League.

Winners

References

External links
Ladies European Tour

Former Ladies European Tour events
Swedish Golf Tour (women) events
Golf tournaments in Sweden
Recurring sporting events established in 1985